Rudolph II (or Rudolph the Kind) (died 10 April 1232) was Count of Habsburg in the Aargau and a progenitor of the royal House of Habsburg.  

He was the only son of Count Albert III of Habsburg and Ita of Pfullendorf. He married Agnes of Staufen. Rudolph was the father of Count Albert IV of Habsburg and Count Rudolph III of Habsburg and the grandfather of King Rudolph I of Germany.

Counts of Habsburg
1232 deaths
Year of birth unknown